The College of Veterinary Sciences and Animal Husbandry, Mhow is  a constituent college of Nana ji deshmukh University of Veterinary Science, Jabalpur an autonomous veterinary university in India, and is a pioneer college in the field of veterinary sciences in India. It is one of the oldest veterinary colleges in Madhya Pradesh, was founded in 1955 the present building of the college was inaugurated by the first prime minister of India Pt.Jawahar Lal Nehru on 12 November 1959.

The campus is situated in near Mhow cantonment and is 18 km from the Indore railway station on state highway 1 earlier  national highway 3.

The campus is spread in over 263 acres of land.  It has an college building academic block, administrative block, teaching veterinary complex.  It also has a dairy farm and a poultry farm. The college offers both undergraduate and postgraduate degrees in veterinary sciences and a diploma course in animal husbandry. Prof. Dr Mk Mehta is  former Dean of the college. Prof. Dr Rk jain is the current Dean of the college.

Campus and student activities 
The college campus has accommodation facilities for its staff and students; there are 2 boys hostels namely Gandhi Hall and Tagore Hall, and a separate girls hostel. Every year in end of January the college organises an annual cultural and sports week.

Here in poultry farm famous  kadaknath breed(jhabua region ) of Poultry is reared.

References 

 http://mppcvv.org
 https://web.archive.org/web/20130819001242/http://veterinarycollegemhow.org/

Veterinary schools in India
Universities and colleges in Madhya Pradesh
Universities and colleges in Mhow